Rossville is an extinct town in Knox County, in the U.S. state of Ohio.

History
Rossville had its start when the railroad was extended to that point. The town was named for Jacob Ross, proprietor.

References

Geography of Knox County, Ohio
Ghost towns in Ohio